Harold Phillips may refer to:
 Lord Woodbine (Harold Adolphus Phillips) (1929–2000), Trinidadian calypsonian and music promoter
 Harold Phillips (British Army officer) (1909–1980) 
 Harold H. Phillips (1928–1999), Ghanaian doctor and academic
 Harold Meyer Phillips (1874–1967), American chess player